Flinders Street railway station is a train station located on the corner of Flinders and Swanston streets in the Melbourne central business district, Victoria, Australia. Opened in 1854, the historic station serves the entire electrified metropolitan rail network, as well as some country services to eastern Victoria. Backing onto the Yarra River in the heart of the city, the complex includes platforms and structures that stretch over more than two whole city blocks, from east of Swanston Street nearly to Market Street.

Flinders Street is served by Metro's suburban services, and V/Line regional services to Gippsland. It is the busiest station on Melbourne's metropolitan network, with an average of 77,153 daily entries recorded in the 2017/18 fiscal year. It was the terminus of the first railway in Australia (the Port Melbourne line) and was reputedly the world's busiest passenger station in the 1920s, owing to the concentration of services there that was only rectified with the construction of the City Loop in the 1970s. Its main platform (operationally divided into platforms 1 and 14) is Australia's 2nd longest, and the eighteenth longest railway platform in the world. Flinders Street is responsible for two of Melbourne's busiest pedestrian crossings, both across Flinders Street, including one of Melbourne's few pedestrian scrambles.

The station's current main building was completed in 1909 and is a cultural icon of Melbourne. The distinctive and eclectic Edwardian building, with its prominent dome, arched entrance, tower and clocks is one of the city's most recognisable landmarks, and its grand, somewhat exotic character led to the popular myth that the design was actually intended for Mumbai's Victoria Terminus and vice versa, but was swapped in the post.

The Melbourne saying "I'll meet you under the clocks" refers to the row of indicator clocks above the main entrance, which show the next departure for each line; the alternative, "I'll meet you on the steps", refers to the wide staircase beneath the clocks.

It has been listed on the Victorian Heritage Register since 1982.

History

Early terminus
The first railway station to occupy the Flinders Street site was a collection of weatherboard train sheds. It was opened on 12 September 1854 by the Lieutenant-Governor, Charles Hotham. The terminus was the first city railway station in Australia, and the opening day saw the first steam train trip in the country. It travelled to Sandridge (now Port Melbourne), over the since-redeveloped Sandridge Bridge and along the now-light rail Port Melbourne line.

There is some confusion over the original name of the station.  In his book "Victorian Railways to '62", Leo Harrigan indicates that it was first named "Melbourne Terminus".  Newspaper articles about the opening in September 1854 refer to "Melbourne terminus" with a lower case t, which may have caused this mis-apprehension.

H.K Atkinson in his book "Suburban Tickets of the Victorian Railways", lists the station as being called "Flinders Street" from its opening.  Early tickets for the railway just show "Melbourne" as the destination.  Moreover, a newspaper report of December 1854 mentions that the Hobsons Bay Railway Company shareholder meeting was held at "Flinders Street Station".

In all likelihood, the station was called "Melbourne, Flinders Street"  from the outset, and the somewhat superfluous "Melbourne" was gradually dropped through common usage.  When Prince's Bridge station opened across the street in 1859, the Flinders Street name would undoubtedly have become more prominent.  The platforms for trains arriving from Station Pier retained the "Melbourne, Flinders Street" signage well into the twentieth century, so migrants fresh off the boat wouldn't be confused about where they were.
The first terminus had a single platform 30 metres long, and was located beside the Fish Market building on the south-west corner of Swanston and Flinders Streets. An additional platform was provided in 1877, along with two overhead bridges to provide passenger access, followed by additional timber and corrugated iron buildings and a telegraph station in 1879. The first signal boxes were opened at the station in 1883, one at each end of the platforms. By the 1890s, a third island platform had been constructed. Melbourne's two other early central-city stations, Spencer Street and Princes Bridge, opened in 1859. Spencer Street served the lines to the west of the city, and was isolated from the eastern side of the network until a ground level railway was built connecting it to Flinders Street in 1879, this track being replaced by the Flinders Street Viaduct in 1889.

Princes Bridge was originally separated from Flinders Street, even though it was only on the opposite side of Swanston Street. Once the railway line was extended under the street in 1865 to join the two, Princes Bridge was closed. It was reopened in April 1879, and from 1909 slowly became amalgamated into Flinders Street. Federation Square now occupies its site. Up until the 1880s a number of designs for a new station had been prepared, but none ever went further.

Current building

By the 1880s, it was becoming clear that a new central passenger station was needed to replace the existing ad-hoc station buildings. A design competition was held in 1883, but the winning entry, by William Salway, featuring a pair of grandiose Italianate buildings either side of a rebuilt Princes Bridge, was not proceeded with.

A second, more comprehensive design competition was held in late 1899, and 17 entries were received. The competition was essentially for the detailed design of the station building, because decisions had already been made about the track and platform layout, the location of the concourse and entrances, and even the room layout to some extent. It has also been that there would be one overall platform roof.

In May 1900, the £500 first prize was awarded to railway employees James Fawcett and H. P. C. Ashworth (Fawcett and Ashworth), whose design, named Green Light, was in the French Renaissance style. It included a large dome over the main entrance, and tall clock tower over the Elizabeth Street entrance, an entrance opposite Degraves Street, and two subways. There was to be a roof over the platforms ‘supported by 12 columns’, of corrugated iron and with minimal amounts of glass to protect against the summer sun, though drawings have not survived. The Swanston Street elevation does survive, which shows an impressive three-arched roof running east–west, with a tall stained glass east end, which most likely was only to cover the concourse.

Work began in 1900 on the rearrangement of the station tracks, while the final design of the station building was still being worked on. Work on the central pedestrian subway started in 1901, with the foundations of the main building completed by 1903.

In 1904, in mid construction, the plans were extensively modified by the Railways Commissioners. The proposed train shed was replaced by individual platform roofs, and it was decided not to include the arched concourse roof. To increase office space, a fourth storey was added to the main building, which resulted in the arches above each entrance on Flinders Street being lowered, decreasing their dominance.

In 1905, work began on the station building itself, starting at the west end and progressing towards the main dome. Ballarat builder Peter Rodger was awarded the £93,000 contract. The building was originally to have been faced in stone, but that was considered too costly, so red brick, with cement render details, was used for the main building instead. Grey granite from Harcourt was used for many details at ground level on the Flinders Street side, "in view of the importance of this great public work". The southern facade of the main building consisted of a lightweight timber frame clad with zinc sheets, which were scored into blocks and painted red to look like large bricks. That was done to create corridors instead of what were to be open-access balconies inside the scrapped train shed.

Work on the dome started in 1906. The structure required heavy foundations as it extended over railway tracks. In May 1908, work was progressing more slowly than planned, with the expected completion date of April 1909 increasingly unlikely to be met. Rodger's contract was terminated in August 1908. A Royal Commission was appointed in May 1910, finding that Rodger could be held accountable for the slow progress in 1908, but he should be compensated for the difficulties before then. The Way and Works Branch of the Victorian Railways took over the project, and the station was essentially finished by mid-1909. The verandah along Flinders Street, and the concourse roof and verandah along Swanston Street, were not completed until after the official opening in 1910.

The building had three levels at the concourse, or Swanston Street, end, and four at the lower Elizabeth Street, or platform, end. Numerous shops and lettable spaces were provided, some on the concourse, but especially along the Flinders Street frontage, many at lower than street level, accessed by stairs, which created a fifth/basement level. The top three levels of the main building contain a large number of rooms, particularly along the Flinders Street frontage, mostly intended for railway use, but also many as lettable spaces. Numerous ticket windows were located at each entry, with services, such as a restaurant, country booking office, lost luggage office and visitors help booth, at the concourse or platform level. Much of the top floor was purpose-built for the then new Victorian Railway Institute, including a library, gym and a lecture hall, later used as a ballroom. Those rooms have been largely abandoned and decaying since the 1980s. For a number of years in the 1930s and 1940s, the building featured a creche next to the main dome on the top floor, with an open-air playground on an adjoining roof. Since 1910, the basement store beside the main entrance has been occupied by a hat store, known as 'City Hatters' since 1933.

The first electric train service operated from Flinders Street to Essendon in 1919, and by 1923 it was thought to be the world's busiest passenger station, with 2300 trains and 300,000 passengers daily. In 1954, to cater for increasing traffic, as well as for the 1956 Summer Olympics, the Degraves Street subway from the station was extended to the north side of Flinders Street, creating Campbell Arcade.

Redevelopment plans
Plans arose at various times from the 1960s to the 1970s for the demolition or redevelopment of the station, as well as the adjacent Jolimont Yard area. The station had fallen into disrepair, having not been cleaned in decades, and covered with advertising hoardings and light up signs.

In 1962, the Minister for Transport and HKJ Pty Ltd signed an agreement for a £30 million redevelopment of the station that would have resulted in the demolition of the clock tower and replacement with an office building up to 60 stories high. Work was to begin in 1964, but instead the Gas & Fuel Building was constructed over Princes Bridge station. In 1967 a company purchased the option to lease the space above Flinders Street Station, planning to build a shopping plaza and two office towers, the dome and clock tower being kept as part of the design, but strong opposition saw this project lapse.In 1972, Victorian Premier Henry Bolte unveiled another redevelopment plan, to cover  of space above the station and Jolimont Yard for a complex of shops, offices, theatres and other community facilities. A newspaper report of 1974 said that planning was still underway for the $250 million proposal, but by 1975, public perceptions had begun to turn towards retention of the station. A Builders Labourers Federation green ban at the time helped preserve it in its existing form. The controversy over these proposals led to a re-apprasial of the architecture and significance of the station, which had been seen as something of an oddity, or even simply as dirty and ugly, such that it was classified by the National Trust of Australia (Victoria) by 1976, and eventually listed on the state Heritage Register in 1982.

In 1989, under the John Cain government, an agreement to construct a "Festival Marketplace" was signed. Designed by Daryl Jackson architects, it was to be built over the existing platforms in a style sympathetic to the existing station, and be completed by 1992. Planned to feature shops, restaurants and cafes, the project was abandoned in 1991 after the inability of the financiers to come up with the $205 million required due to the early 1990s recession.

In November 2011, the Victorian Government launched a $1 million international design competition to rejuvenate and restore the station. In October 2012, after receiving 118 submissions, six finalists were selected. The public could vote and the jury's choice and people's choice winner were announced on 8 August 2013. The competition winner was Hassell + Herzog & de Meuron, while the people's choice winner were University of Melbourne students Eduardo Velasquez, Manuel Pineda and Santiago Medina. No funding was attached to the competition, and no major changes were undertaken.

Refurbishment

The Swanston Street concourse has undergone the most change of any part of the station, and is now three times the depth of the original structure, is located near Federation Square and only the canopy and roofed area on Swanston Street remains of the original. After the first round of works in 1985 a City of Melbourne councillor, Trevor Huggard, described the renovation as "vandalism of historically important sections of the station", and in 1997 the National Trust of Australia described the additions to the concourse as unsympathetic and detrimental to the station, having "the character of a modern shopping centre".

The television displays used to display next train information were added to each platform in July 1980.

In 1982, a $7 million refurbishment was announced by the Minister for Transport, Steven Crabb, divided into four phases, designed by the railways architect Kris Kudlicki. Completed by 1984, the first escalators at the station provided on platforms 2 and 3 replaced ramps, and new public toilets were provided, replacing those over the platforms. The main station concourse was tiled and extended westward over the tracks, with skylights added above the ramps, and 16 new shops opened on the concourse. A restaurant was built on the southern side facing the river, which opened in October 1985, but closed soon after, instead becoming the "Clocks on Flinders" poker machine venue in 1994. The main steps were embedded with electrical circuits to keep them dry in June 1985.

In 1993, the Elizabeth Street subway was extended and opened at the Southbank end. Conservation work was also carried out to the main building, with the external facade repainted, exterior feature lighting installed, and the stained glass feature windows above each entry restored. Further changes were made through the late 1990s with the opening of access from the main Swanston Street concourse to platform 1, platform resurfacing with tactile tiles, and the replacement of the remainder of the original platform access ramps (except platform 10) with escalators and elevators.

The tracks to the east of the station were rebuilt between 1997 and 1998 to clear the way for the Federation Square project. Jolimont Yard was eliminated, with $40 million spent to reduce 53 operating lines between Flinders Street and Richmond Station to just 12. The number of points was also reduced, from 164 to 48. These changes also saw a reallocation of platform usage at the station, country trains being shifted from platform 1 to platform 10, and Clifton Hill group trains being shifted from the deleted Princes Bridge station to platform 1.

The final round of changes were completed by 2007. It included refurbishment of the building roof and concourse foundations, an upgrade of platform 10 with escalators and a lift replacing the ramp, the relocation of all ticket booking offices to the main entrance under the main dome and new LCD passenger information displays installed on the platforms, subways and concourse. In March 2009 an escalator replaced the lift to platform 12 and 13, with platform 13 also extended west into daylight along the alignment of the former platform 11.

In 2008, the retail pavilions on the concourse were rebuilt, increasing their area. An investigation of the potential of the abandoned spaces in the station, overseen by a task force comprising representatives from Connex, the Committee for Melbourne, Melbourne City Council, Heritage Victoria, was completed the same year, but the conclusions were not made public. In January 2010, one of the first announcements by the new Minister for Public Transport was that the government was investigating the refurbishment of the abandoned spaces for "cultural uses".
In mid-February 2015, Premier Daniel Andrews and Minister for Public Transport Jacinta Allan announced that $100 million would be spent for urgent refurbishment works to upgrade station platforms, entrances, toilets, information displays and to restore the exterior of the main building. By July 2017, the station had been almost completely repainted in the original 1910 colours.

As painting continued in January 2018, a further round of works was announced including the renewal of the Elizabeth Street pedestrian subway and rebuilding of the subway's south entrance to include direct access to platform 10.

Clocks

The distinctive clocks under the main dome that show the departure times of the next trains date back to the 1860s. Sixty Bathgate indicators were purchased from England for use at the Flinders Street, Spencer Street, Richmond and South Yarra stations. Those at Flinders Street were placed into storage when the old station was demolished in 1904, with 28 placed into the new station in 1910. They were located at the main entry under the dome, the southern side archway, and the Degraves and Elizabeth Street entrances.

Manually operated by a railway officer using a long pole, during an 8-hour period the clocks at the main entrance were changed an average of 900 times. The original indicator clocks were removed from service in 1983 as part of a redevelopment of the station, with their replacement by digital displays planned. An outpouring of public outrage and sentimentality saw the decision reversed within one day. The clocks at the main entrance were altered to automatic operation by computer, but those at the Degraves and Elizabeth Street entrances were replaced by large airport-style split-flap displays.

The space "under the clocks" or "on the steps" leading to the dome has been a popular informal meeting place for Melburnians since the station's opening. Although the area was not intended for this purpose, and there is no seating or other infrastructure to suggest it as a destination, the locationopposite the well-known Young and Jackson Hotel and overlooking two of the busiest tram routes in the citymeans it is accessible and visible to many of the city's main pedestrian thoroughfares. Many people who meet "under the clocks" do not arrive by train; the site's cultural significance extends beyond its main function as a transport hub.

A clock tower has also existed at the end of Elizabeth Street since 1883. The first clock was known as the 'Water Tower Clock', after a wooden framed water tower erected on the site in 1853. This clock remained in place until 1905 when work begun on the new station, the clock tower being moved to outside Princes Bridge station. In 1911 it was moved to Spencer Street station, where it remained until the station was redeveloped in 1967. Sold to a private collector, it was returned to public ownership and in 1999 was put on display at the Scienceworks Museum, Spotswood. It was returned to the renamed Southern Cross station in 2014.

Today's Elizabeth Street clock tower was constructed between August 1906 and November 1907, the clock being built by Melbourne clock maker F. Ziegeler to an English design. Originally needing to be wound every day, it is now electrically operated. It was cleaned and overhauled between 2017 and 2018 before being fully restored to service.

Signal boxes

The first signal boxes were opened at the station in 1883, one at each end of the platforms. From the 1900s until 1983, five signal boxes controlled traffic into the station.

Flinders Street A was located at the western end of the station, between the lines to St Kilda/Port Melbourne and Spencer Street, and controlled all traffic from the west. It was of "traditional" Victorian Railways design, in brick, and had two mechanical lever frames of equal size, totalling 280 levers. The mechanical signals were decommissioned in October 1979. The signal box has been burnt twice, the second time being in 2002, destroying the timber and glass superstructure and slate roof. In 2009, it was rebuilt as Signal, a youth arts centre funded by the City of Melbourne.

Flinders Street B was located at the Richmond end of platforms 8 and 9 and controlled the southern tracks from Jolimont Yard. It was of traditional VR design, in brick, and was demolished when the Federation Square deck was built.

Flinders Street C was located beyond the Richmond end of platforms 4 and 5 and controlled the northern tracks from Jolimont Yard. It was of traditional VR design and was demolished together with Flinders Street B.

Flinders Street D was located at the Richmond end of the Princes Bridge island platform (later incorporated into Flinders Street as platforms 15 and 16). The structure, of utilitarian brick construction, remains today, just beyond the Federation Square deck.

Flinders Street E was located at Richmond Junction, and controlled the junction as well as access into the Richmond end of the stabling sidings. Of utilitarian brick construction, it remains in place today underneath the William Barak Bridge.

Since 1983, the station has been remotely controlled by Metrol. The station precinct is operated by four interlockings corresponding to former signal boxes A, B, D and E.

Platforms

The platform layout at Flinders Street is unusual among Australian terminal stations for being almost entirely composed of through tracksa product of the constrained geography of the site and the haphazard development of the rail network around it. The opening of the rail connection under Swanston Street in 1865 enabled trains from Brighton to access the platform, and so it was later extended to enable the simultaneous arrival of trains from the east and west.

A second platform to the south of the first was provided in 1877, after the amalgamation of railway companies began to increase traffic at the station. Platform expansion began in earnest following the 1882 recommendation that Flinders Street be developed as a major terminal, and the subsequent government acquisition of the railways; between 1889 and 1892, three further platforms were constructed on land acquired from the former fish market in anticipation of additional traffic, which eventuated when Essendon, Coburg and Williamstown trains were routed across the viaduct in 1894. Development continued with the completion of the 1899 ground plan, which specified a total of 11 platformsplatform 1 along the main building and five pairs of island platforms to the south. The remaining platforms were constructed as works progressed on the main building, and in 1909, a decision was made to extend platforms 10 and 11 eastwards, creating two new platforms numbered 12 and 13.

Railway officials proposed amalgamating the nearby Princes Bridge station with Flinders Street with improved passenger connections in the 1890s, but failed to obtain funding from the state government for the project despite the massive redevelopment works. The west end of platform 1 could also be used as a separate "Platform 1 West". Eventually, in 1980, Princes Bridge was formally incorporated into Flinders Street and its three platforms were renumbered 14, 15 and 16.

Several platforms were decommissioned in the early 1990s following reductions in suburban train services. Platform 11 fell into disuse following the closure of the Port Melbourne line in 1987, and platforms 14, 15 and 16 were closed to regular services, along with the west end of platform 1. Although proposals were made to reopen it by the East West Link Needs Assessment, the platform 11 site was converted into a bar and restaurant in 2014. Platforms 15 and 16 were demolished to make way for Federation Square, but platform 14 remains intermittently in use.

A short dock platform, known as the Milk Dock or Parcels Dock, was constructed in 1910 to the north of platform 1 at the west end of the main building. Prior to the widespread transport of dairy products by road, the dock was a distribution centre for milk and other small goods arriving in Melbourne on early morning trains from Gippsland. Other small goods and parcels were later also loaded at the dock until most such traffic ceased in the 1960s. The structure remains essentially intact.

Three concourses link the platforms. The main concourse is at the east end of the station, located off Swanston Street and the main dome, and has direct access to all platforms via escalators, stair and elevators. The Degraves Street subway runs under the centre of the station, exiting to Flinders Street at the north end, with stairs directly connecting to all platforms except for platform numbers 12 and 13. The Elizabeth Street subway is at the west end, and has direct access via ramps to all platforms except for platforms 12, 13 and 14, and via a stairway to platform 1, reopened in 2017.

Trains may use a different platform if the platform it is originally scheduled at is occupied.

 

Platform 1:
Destinations via City Loop – Clifton Hill Group:
 all stations and limited stop services to Hurstbridge, peak services to Macleod and Heidelberg
 all stations and limited stop services to Mernda, peak services to Epping and South Morang 

Platform 2 & 3:
Destinations via City Loop – Burnley Group:
 all stations and limited stop services to Belgrave, peak services to Upper Ferntree Gully
 all stations and limited stop services to Lilydale, peak services to Blackburn, Ringwood and Mooroolbark
 all stations and limited stop services to Glen Waverley, peak services to Syndal
 weekday all stations and limited stop services to Alamein, morning peak service to Riversdale

Platform 4 & 5:
Destinations via City Loop – Northern Group:
 all stations and limited stop services to Craigieburn, peak services to Broadmeadows
 all stations and limited stop services to Upfield
 all stations and limited stop services to Watergardens & Sunbury

Destinations via Richmond (platform 4 only):
 all stations and limited stop services to Blackburn
 all stations and limited stop services to Blackburn
 weekday all stations and limited stop services to Alamein
 all stations and limited stop services to Glen Waverley

Platform 6 & 7:
Destinations via Richmond:
 express services to Pakenham
 express services to Cranbourne
 V/Line services to Traralgon & Bairnsdale (pick up only)
 V/Line services to Southern Cross (set down only)

Platform 8 & 9:
Destinations via Richmond:
 all stations and limited stop services to Frankston

Destinations via Southern Cross (platform 9 only):
 all stations and limited stop services to Laverton & Werribee
 all stations services to Williamstown

Platform 10:
Destinations via Southern Cross:
 weekday all stations and limited stop services to Laverton & Werribee
 weekday all stations services to Williamstown
 limited stop services to Showgrounds and/or Flemington Racecourse (special event days only)
 select services to Craigieburn

Platform 11:

Removed and fenced off, Now a restaurant separate from the station. 

Platform 12 & 13:
Destinations via Richmond:
 all stations services to Sandringham
Destinations via Southern Cross (platform 12 only):
  select services to Laverton and Werribee 
Platform 14:Currently not in use, "Emergency Egress Only".

Transport links

Yarra Trams operates 14 services via Flinders Street, Swanston Street and Elizabeth Street:

Footnotes

Bibliography

External links

Flinders Street Station, historic images and original architectural plans at Culture Victoria
 Melway map at street-directory.com.au

Art Nouveau architecture in Melbourne
Art Nouveau railway stations
Buildings and structures in Melbourne City Centre
Domes
Green bans
Heritage-listed buildings in Melbourne
Landmarks in Melbourne
Listed railway stations in Australia
Premium Melbourne railway stations
Railway stations in Melbourne
Railway stations in Australia opened in 1854
Railway stations in the City of Melbourne (LGA)
Romanesque Revival architecture in Australia